The Witness for the Prosecution is a 2016 British mystery drama thriller television serial broadcast on BBC One over Christmas 2016. The two-part programme was adapted by Sarah Phelps and directed by Julian Jarrold and is based on Agatha Christie's short story of the same name. The expanded plot is based on Christie's original short story with the original ending, which is different than that of previous stage, film and television versions, including Billy Wilder's 1957 film version.

Cast
 Billy Howle as Leonard Vole - Accused
 Andrea Riseborough as Romaine Heilger - Vole's partner
 Monica Dolan as Janet McIntyre - Maid
 Kim Cattrall as Emily French - Victim
 Toby Jones as John Mayhew - Solicitor
 David Haig as Sir Charles Carter - Barrister
 Tim McMullan as Sir Hugo Meredith - Prosecutor
 Robert East as Justice Greville Parris - Judge
 Dorian Lough as Detective Breem
 Hayley Carmichael as Alice Mayhew - Mayhew's wife
 Paul Ready as Tripp

Episodes

Critical reception
Reviewing Part 1 in The Daily Telegraph, Gerard O'Donovan decided, "Much of its sophistication is down to [scriptwriter Sarah Phelps'] multi-layered reworking of Christie's hit 1950s stage drama, that ekes every possible drop of emotion and mystery from what is a very simple premise. Add to that supremely atmospheric set design, Jullian Jarrold's richly inventive direction, plus a terrific cast, and a slice of Yuletide TV heaven was born." He found Riseborough to be the "star of the show", praising "the extraordinary blend of damage and menace she managed to convey", and judged that the "concluding part promises to be one to savour".

The following day, O'Donovan found that in Part 2, "The biggest coup of the BBC's festive adaptation was that not only did it revert to Christie's original twist, but added considerably to it, making for a[n] ... ending […which…] transformed a tale of moral turpitude and greed into something of much greater depth and contemporary resonance." Again praising the "captivating" Riseborough, he found that "Toby Jones was also superb, all too credible as small-time solicitor John Mayhew", and added, "At every step, the acting […] and skilfully-evoked atmosphere added layer upon layer of complexity, moral ambiguity and humour to what was at heart a simple premise".

Writing in the Radio Times, Ben Dowell acknowledged "an ingenious plot twist – known to many Christie aficionados – but here given a few smart thematic manipulations by scriptwriter Sarah Phelps", noting her "major achievement is to make the First World War the emotional lynchpin of the whole saga". Dowell concluded by saying, "In the end this was a story of many loves—of Emily French's love for Vole, of Mayhew's unrequited love for his wife, even Janet's love for Emily. Pole star of course was the passion between Vole and Romaine which burns far too brightly. This was really compelling stuff".

See also
 Witness for the Prosecution (disambiguation)

References

External links
 
 

2016 British television series debuts
2016 British television series endings
2010s British crime drama television series
BBC high definition shows
BBC television dramas
2010s British mystery television series
2010s British television miniseries
Television series by Mammoth Screen
English-language television shows
Television shows set in England
Television shows based on works by Agatha Christie
Films directed by Julian Jarrold